Rex Hartwig and Mervyn Rose were the defending champions, but decided not to play together. Rose partnered with George Worthington but lost in the semifinals to Hartwig and his partner Lew Hoad.

Hartwig and Hoad defeated Neale Fraser and Ken Rosewall in the final, 7–5, 6–4, 6–3 to win the gentlemen's doubles tennis title at the 1955 Wimbledon Championship.

Seeds

  Vic Seixas /  Tony Trabert (semifinals)
  Rex Hartwig /  Lew Hoad (champions)
  Neale Fraser /  Ken Rosewall (semifinals)
  Budge Patty /  Ham Richardson (third round)

Draw

Finals

Top half

Section 1

Section 2

Bottom half

Section 3

Section 4

References

External links

Men's Doubles
Wimbledon Championship by year – Men's doubles